Robert Lawrence "R.L." Ryan (October 29, 1946 – March 22, 1991) was an American actor.

The heavyset character actor was best known for his supporting roles in a handful of b-movies from the 1980s including cult classics The Toxic Avenger, Eat and Run, and Street Trash. Ryan was sometimes credited as Pat Ryan Jr., Bob Ryan, Robert L. Ryan, or Pat Ryan.

Ryan was born in Pennsylvania, where he lived throughout his life up until his sudden death. In 1991, he died of a heart attack at age 44.

Filmography

Actor
Fighting Back (1982) - Neighbor
The Toxic Avenger (1984) - Mayor Belgoody
Birdy (1984) - Joe Sagessa
Invasion U.S.A. (1985) - Construction Worker (uncredited)
Class of Nuke 'Em High (1986) - Mr. Finley
Street Trash (1987) - Frank Schnizer
Mannequin (1987) - Pizzeria Manager
Eat and Run (1987) - Murray Creature
Forever, Lulu (1987) - Fat Man (final film role)

References

External links

1946 births
1991 deaths
American male film actors
Male actors from Pennsylvania
20th-century American male actors